Jan Kovář (born 20 March 1990) is Czech professional ice hockey forward who currently serves as captain of EV Zug of the National League (NL). He is the younger brother of Jakub Kovář.

Playing career
He made his professional debut with HC Plzeň in the Czech Extraliga during the 2008–09 season. Before moving to Russia for the 2013–14 KHL season in signing for Metallurg Magnitogorsk and claiming the Gagarin Cup. Playing within the Czech national team he advanced to the semi finals before being knocked out. In the bronze medal playoff, he scored against Canada, but the team could not win.

As an undrafted free agent after five seasons in the KHL with Magnitogorsk, Kovář signed a one-year, $2 million contract with the New York Islanders, his first team in the NHL on 9 July 2018. On 10 October, after failing to make the team following training camp he was placed on unconditional waivers by the Islanders with the intent of terminating his contract due to facing limited opportunities to continue his adaptation to the North American style if he reported to the AHL with affiliate, Bridgeport Sound Tigers. With the intention to continue his career in North America, Kovář secured a professional try-out contract with the Providence Bruins of the American Hockey League (AHL) on 18 October. On 5 December, Kovář signed a one-month contract HC Plzeň of the Czech Extraliga (ELH).

After playing out the season in the ELH, Kovář left in the off-season, securing a one-year contract with Swiss club EV Zug of the NL on 18 June 2019. His contract included an NHL out-clause through 25 June.

Career statistics

Regular season and playoffs

International

Awards and honors

References

External links
 

1990 births
Living people
Czech ice hockey forwards
HC Plzeň players
Ice hockey players at the 2018 Winter Olympics
Ice hockey players at the 2022 Winter Olympics
Metallurg Magnitogorsk players
Olympic ice hockey players of the Czech Republic
Sportspeople from Písek
Piráti Chomutov players
Providence Bruins players
HC Slovan Ústečtí Lvi players
Czech expatriate ice hockey players in the United States
Czech expatriate ice hockey players in Russia
Czech expatriate ice hockey players in Switzerland